Sikandra Assembly constituency is a part of the Kanpur Dehat district of Uttar Pradesh and it comes under Etawah Lok Sabha constituency.

Members of Legislative Assembly

 *By Poll

Election results

2022

2017 by-election

2017

2012

See also
Akbarpur-Raniya Assembly constituency
Bhognipur Assembly constituency
Rasulabad Assembly constituency

References

"Sikandra Assembly Election 2012, Uttar Pradesh". Empowering India. Retrieved 8 July 2014.

External links
 

Assembly constituencies of Uttar Pradesh
Kanpur Dehat district